Keith Kirkwood (born December 26, 1994) is an American football wide receiver for the New Orleans Saints of the National Football League (NFL). He played college football at Hawaii and Temple.

Early life and education
Kirkwood was born and raised in Neptune Township, New Jersey. He went to Green Grove Elementary School. Kirkwood played both basketball and football at Neptune High School, from which he graduated in 2013.

College career
Kirkwood attended and played for Temple University after transferring from the University of Hawaii.

Professional career

New Orleans Saints
On May 1, 2018, the New Orleans Saints signed Kirkwood as an undrafted free agent to a three-year, $1.72 million contract that includes $42,000 guaranteed and a signing bonus of $17,000.

Throughout training camp, Kirkwood competed for a roster spot as a backup wide receiver against Austin Carr, Tommylee Lewis, Brandon Coleman, Josh Huff, Travin Dural, and Eldridge Massington. On September 1, 2018, the New Orleans Saints waived Kirkwood as part of their final roster cuts, but signed him to their practice squad the following day after clearing waivers.

On November 10, 2018, the New Orleans Saints promoted Kirkwood from their practice squad to their active roster after newly acquired free agent Dez Bryant tore his Achilles tendon during practice. The Saints placed multiple wide receivers on injured reserve after sustaining injuries, including Ted Ginn Jr., Tommylee Lewis, Travin Dural, and Cameron Meredith. Kirkwood became the fourth wide receiver on the depth chart upon joining the active roster, behind Michael Thomas, Tre'Quan Smith, and Austin Carr.

On November 11, 2018, Kirkwood made his professional regular season debut and caught two passes for 45 yards and made one tackle on special teams during a 51–14 victory at the Cincinnati Bengals in Week 10.

On September 17, 2019, Kirkwood was placed on injured reserve with a hamstring injury. He was designated for return from injured reserve on November 13, 2019, and began practicing with the team again. However, he was not activated by the end of the three-week practice window on December 4, 2019, and remained on injured reserve for the rest of the season.

Carolina Panthers
On April 1, 2020, Kirkwood signed with the Carolina Panthers reuniting him with former Temple head coach Matt Rhule and former college teammates Robby Anderson, P. J. Walker, and Colin Thompson. Kirkwood was placed on injured reserve on September 7, due to a shoulder injury. He was designated for return from injured reserve on September 30, 2020, and began practicing with the team again. He was activated on October 17, but re-injured his left clavicle in the next game and was placed back on injured reserve on October 20.

On February 22, 2021, Kirkwood signed a one-year contract extension with the Panthers. He was waived on August 31, 2021, and re-signed to the practice squad the next day. Ahead of the Week 8 game against the Atlanta Falcons, Kirkwood was promoted to the active roster.

On June 6, 2022, Kirkwood re-signed with the Panthers. He was released on August 30, 2022.

New Orleans Saints (second stint)
On September 28, 2022, Kirkwood was signed to the New Orleans Saints practice squad. On October 15, 2022, Kirkwood was promoted to the active roster. He was released on October 29 and re-signed to the practice squad. He was promoted on January 4, 2023. He was re-signed on February 17, 2023.

References

External links
Temple Owls Bio

1994 births
Living people
American football wide receivers
Carolina Panthers players
Hawaii Rainbow Warriors football players
Neptune High School alumni
New Orleans Saints players
Players of American football from New Jersey
People from Neptune Township, New Jersey
Sportspeople from Monmouth County, New Jersey
Temple Owls football players